Old Capitol City Roller Derby is a women's flat track roller derby league based in Iowa City, Iowa. Founded in 2008, the league currently consists of two teams which compete against teams from other leagues. Old Capitol City is a member of the Women's Flat Track Derby Association (WFTDA).

History
The league began practicing in late 2008.  In April 2010, it defeated the Des Moines Derby Dames travel team, for that league's first ever loss.

Old Capitol City was accepted into the Women's Flat Track Derby Association Apprentice Program in October 2010, and became a full member of the WFTDA in January 2012.

Old Capitol City changed their name in 2015 to Old Capitol City Roller Derby in order to project more gender inclusiveness, and at the same time changed the league organization to a non-profit.

WFTDA rankings

References

Iowa City, Iowa
Roller derby leagues established in 2008
Roller derby leagues in Iowa
2008 establishments in Iowa